The Sixtiers (Russian: Шестидесятники, romanized: Shestidesyatniki, Ukrainian: Шістдесятники, romanized: Shistdesiatnyky; "people of the 60s") were representatives of а new generation of the Soviet Intelligentsia, who entered the cultural and political life of the USSR during the late 1950s and 1960s, after the Khrushchev Thaw. Most of them were born between 1925 and 1945, and their worldviews were formed by years of Stalin's repressions and purges, which affected many of the Sixtiers' immediate families, and World War II, in which many of them had volunteered to fight.

The Sixtiers were distinguished by their liberal and anti-totalitarian views, and romanticism, which found vivid expressions in music and visual arts. Although most of the Sixtiers believed in Communist ideals, they had come to be strongly disappointed with Stalin's regime and its repression of basic civil liberties.

The Sixtiers can be roughly divided into two groups: the "physicists" (those involved in sciences) and the "lyricists" (those involved in arts, such as writers, theatre and film professionals, etc.). Among some of the common attributes and pastimes of the Sixtiers were Bard (singer-songwriter) music, poetry, disillusionment in politics, and love for camping trips to remote regions of the USSR.

After the beginning of the Perestroika and Glasnost policies (in the late 1980s – early 1990s), the term "Sixtiers" was also used to denote the representatives of the new generation of communist elites whose political views were formed in the late 1950s – early 1960s. These include politicians M. Gorbachev, O. Yakovlev, philosophers A. Zinoviev, M. Mamardashvili, Y. Levada, political scientists A. Bovin, F. Burlatsky, mass media editors V. Korotych, E. Yakovlev, S. Zalygin and many others.

Some parallels can be drawn between the Sixtiers and the New Left and hippie movements in the West, but even closer similarities can be found with the more intellectual-oriented Beat Generation.

Ukrainian Sixtiers 
The Ukrainian Sixtiers movement was dominated by national ideas. Many Ukrainian Sixtiers defended the national language and culture, and freedom of artistic creativity.

The most famous members of the movement were writers Ivan Drach, Valeriy Shevchuk, Mykola Vingranovsky, V. Drozd, Hryhir Tiutiunnyk, Borys Oliynyk, V. Donchyk, Vasyl Symonenko, Mykola Kholodny, Lina Kostenko, Yevhen Hutsalo; painting artists Alla Horska, Viktor Zaretsky, Boris Chichibabin; textile and painting artist Lyubov Panchenko; literary critics Ivan Dziuba, Yevhen Sverstyuk; director Les Tanyuk; film directors Sergei Parajanov, Yuri Ilyenko; art critics Roman Korogodsky, Y. Smyrny; and translators Hryhoriy Kochur, Mykola Lukash and Mykhailyna Kotsiubynska.

The Sixtiers opposed official dogmatism, professed freedom of creative expression, cultural pluralism, and the priority of universal values over class ones. They were largely influenced by the Western humanistic culture, the traditions of the Executed Renaissance and the Ukrainian culture of the late XIX – early XX centuries.

Cultural activities of the Sixtiers included informal literary readings and art exhibitions, vigils in memory of repressed artists, and theatre performances. The members of the movement also composed petitions in defense of Ukrainian culture. The Club of Creative Youth "Contemporary" (founded in 1959-60) in Kyiv and the club "Snowdrop" (founded in 1962) in Lviv became centers of alternative national culture. The Sixtiers restored the traditions of the classical pre-revolutionary intelligentsia, which aspired to spiritual independence, political alienation, the ideals of civil society and service to the people.

Since the freethinking Sixtiers failed to keep within the official ideological and aesthetic boundaries, their cultural activities caused dissatisfaction of the authorities. The end of 1962 marked the start of massive pressure on the nonconformist intelligentsia. The Sixtiers were not allowed to be published, and were accused of "formalism," "inaction," and "bourgeois nationalism". In response, the ideas of the Sixtiers began to spread in samizdat.

Faced with fierce resistance from the party apparatus, some of the Sixtiers compromised with the authorities, while others evolved into political dissidents, members of the human rights movement, and open opposition to the regime.

See also 
 Culture of the Soviet Union
 Silent Generation

Further reading

References

Cultural generations
Demographics of the Soviet Union
1950s in the Soviet Union
1960s in the Soviet Union
Society of the Soviet Union
Soviet culture